In functional analysis, a discipline within mathematics, the Szász–Mirakjan–Kantorovich operators are defined by

See also
Szász–Mirakyan operator

Notes

References

Approximation theory